El Defensor de Granada (The Defender of Granada) was a Spanish newspaper with liberal-progressive ideology that was published in Granada between the end of the 19th century and the first third of the 20th century. It disappeared after the outbreak of the Spanish Civil War.

From 1907 it belonged to the Sociedad Editorial de España.

History 

El Defensor de Granada was founded in 1880 by Luis Seco de Lucena Escalada.
In its initial stage the newspaper had the financing and valuable support of José Genaro Villanova, a rich businessman and politician from Granada. 
Its circulation was limited to the city of Granada. 
In 1907 it became the property of the Sociedad Editorial de España, subsequently reconstituted as Sociedad Editora Universal.
This company already owned other leading national newspapers such as El Imparcial and Heraldo de Madrid.

The newspaper became the main voice for liberalism, secularism, modernization of Spain and political regeneration, which gave it a wide audience and gave it more influence than other newspapers. 
In 1927 it had a circulation of 12,000 copies a day, which made it the most important newspaper in Granada.
In the local journalistic field at that time its main competitors were the Noticiero Granadino, La Publicidad  and, to a lesser extent,  La Gaceta del Sur.

In the last twelve years of its existence El Defensor de Granada was headed by the eminent writer and journalist Constantino Ruiz Carnero.
He was also active in politics and became mayor of Granada for a brief period.
After the proclamation of the Second Spanish Republic, during the 1930s El Defensor de Granada showed itself clearly sympathetic to the new regime.
In these years its main journalistic rival was the Catholic and conservative Ideal newspaper.

At the start of the Spanish Civil War, on July 20, 1936, the Defender of Granada was closed by the military coup leaders and its facilities were raided.
The property was seized by the rebel forces.
Its director was arrested days later, on July 27, and killed one day without trial early in August 1936.
The repression also affected another of its journalists, Eufrasio Martin, 
His wife was killed instead of him, since he was not in Granada. 
The civil war meant, in short, the disappearance of the newspaper.

Featured contributors 

Throughout its existence the newspaper had the collaboration of notable figures, including Ángel Ganivet, Paco Seco de Lucena, Francisco de Paula Valladar, Luis Fernández de Córdoba, Federico Olóriz Aguilera, Constantino Ruiz Carnero, Antonio Afán de Ribera, Francisco Javier Simonet, Nicolás María López, Ramón Noguera Bahamonde, Alberto Álvarez de Cienfuegos Cobos, Francisco de Paula Villa-Real, etc.

Notes

Citations

Bibliography

External links

Spanish-language newspapers
History of Granada